The Women's Super-G competition at the 2015 World Championships was held on Tuesday, February 3.

Results
The race was scheduled to start at 11:00 MST, but was delayed 30 minutes due to strong winds.

References

Women's Super-G
2015 in American women's sports
FIS